Greasley is a surname. Notable people with the surname include:

Andrew Greasley (born 1960), English cricketer
Douglas Greasley (1926–2011), English cricketer
Horace Greasley (1918–2010), British Army soldier and World War II prisoner of war

English-language surnames